Babe's Bridge is the remains of a 13th Century bridge over the River Boyne near Navan, Co Meath. The southeast span is extant along with remains of some of the abutments in the river. 

The remaining arch is owned by the heritage trust  An Taisce - The National Trust for Ireland as part of the Boyne Navigation property.

Etymology 
Babe's Bridge was named after the local Norman landowner John le Baub who owned the land where the bridge was built.

History

20th Century 
In the 1980's the Office of Public Works carried out an underpinning of the north abutment in concrete with assistance from Meath County Council.

21st Century 
In 2021 An Taisce and Meath County Council were awarded funding from the Department of Housing, Local Government and Heritage's Community Monuments Fund to carry out conservation studies for the structure.

Future 

An Taisce is seeking funding to carry out conservation works.

External Links 
Navan District Historical Society page on the bridge.

An Taisce - The National Trust for Ireland page on the bridge

References 

Stone bridges
Ruined bridges
Historic sites in Ireland